This list primarily derives from the Maine Coastal Island Registry, a database of the 3166 coastal islands from the largest (Mount Desert Island) to the smallest islets and ledges exposed above mean high tide. Some notable inland freshwater islands, like Frye Island in Sebago Lake, have been included.

Description of columns
Registry # refers to the Maine Coastal Island Registry ("MCIR") assigning each island an identifying number. Many islands have the same Island Name (there are over 20 "Bar Islands," for instance; more than 30 named "Little"), but each has a unique number. Some islands comprising more than one landmass have several registry numbers under one name.

The table lists Cities, Towns, and Counties primarily as a finding aid, since governmental jurisdiction over Maine islands is rife with confusing historical anomalies. For instance, of Maine's 15 island communities inhabited year-round, eight are independent towns, two are part of one town, three belong to mainland municipalities, and two govern themselves as island plantations. Some Maine islands never belonged to any township or once belonged to plantations now defunct; several islands recently seceded from mainland cities, and the sovereignty of two islands remains disputed between the US and Canada.

The Code column refers to Maine Island Registry status. All islands coded as "R" are registered and privately owned. Those listed as "U" are unregistered and held in trust by the State of Maine (some of these may be privately owned but the owners did not register the islands). Islands listed as "E" are exempt from the registry requirements because they are either owned by the state or federal government or have four or more structures on them and were presumed to be privately owned. Islands listed as "T" are held in trust by the state and management transferred to a particular state agency or organization, such as the Maine Department of Inland Fisheries and Wildlife ("ME IF&W").

The Description column is from secondary sources as noted. The description and Acreage are not always available, nor constant since construction, quarrying, farming, logging, fire, or even a single storm can alter the features of an island.

Table

See also
 Maine Coastal Islands National Wildlife Refuge
 Maine Island Trail

Notes

References
 
 

 

Lists of landforms of Maine
Maine